EKHS may refer to:
 East Kentwood High School, Kentwood, Michigan, United States
 East Knox High School, Howard, Ohio, United States